Tapirus oliverasi is a likely invalid extinct species of tapir from South America.

T. oliverasi was described based on dentary remains from the Early Pleistocene deposits at the Libertad Formation in Uruguay that were of  larger size than that of T. terrestris but smaller than T. rioplatensis. However, the validity of species has been questioned and it is considered dubious.

References

Prehistoric tapirs
Pleistocene mammals of South America